WMMC 105.9 FM is a radio station broadcasting a classic hits format. Licensed to Marshall, Illinois, the station serves Terre Haute, Indiana, Charleston, Illinois and Paris, Illinois areas. The station is owned by JKO Media Group, LLC.

History
The station began broadcasting October 2, 1989, and aired an oldies format. In 1992, the station was taken silent. In 1995, the station resumed broadcasting, airing an adult contemporary format. By 2011, the station was airing a classic hits format.

References

External links
WMMC's official website

MMC
Classic hits radio stations in the United States
Radio stations established in 1989
1989 establishments in Illinois